Lorenzen may refer to

People
Lorenzen (surname)
Lorenzen Wright, American basketball player

Places

Austria
Sankt Lorenz, Upper Austria
Sankt Lorenzen am Wechsel, Styria
Sankt Lorenzen bei Knittelfeld, Styria
Sankt Lorenzen bei Scheifling, Styria
Sankt Lorenzen im Mürztal, Styria

Italy
St. Lorenzen South Tyrol

United States
Lorenzen, Mississippi, an unincorporated community

Other
Lorenzen Group, paramilitary group of Danish collaborators, active 1944-1945
USNS Howard O. Lorenzen (T-AGM-25), American missile range instrumentation ship

See also
Lorenzo (disambiguation)